Socket AM5 (LGA 1718) is a zero insertion force flip-chip land grid array (LGA) CPU socket designed by Advanced Micro Devices, that is used for AMD Ryzen microprocessors starting with the Zen 4 microarchitecture. AM5 replaces the Socket AM4 and is AMD's first LGA socket designed for mainstream, non-enthusiast CPUs.

AMD officially confirmed details about the Ryzen 7000 series platform, including support for PCI Express 5.0 and DDR5 as part of their 2022 Product Premiere. The platform launched in September 2022.

Background
In March 2017, with the launch of its new Zen processors, AMD used the AM4 socket that they had previously used with their Bristol Ridge (derived from Excavator) powered Athlon-X4 and some A-Series, a pin grid array (PGA) socket that they promised to support until 2020. In April 2022, AMD released its final CPU for the AM4 socket, the 5800X3D, which featured 96MB of 3D-stacked L3 cache.

Announcement 
At CES 2022, AMD CEO Lisa Su unveiled the AM5 socket and the integrated heat spreader design for the upcoming Ryzen 7000 processors due in late 2022.

On May 23, 2022, AMD provided details about the AM5 socket, its corresponding motherboards, and Ryzen 7000 Series CPUs at Computex in Taipei, Taiwan. At Computex, motherboard vendors ASRock, Gigabyte and others debuted their new X670 motherboards featuring the AM5 socket.

AMD stated that it plans to support the AM5 socket for a number of years as it did with the AM4 socket. During the Ryzen 7000 series reveal on August 29, 2022, AMD confirmed that it would support the AM5 socket until at least 2025.

Features 
 Supports DDR5 in dual-channel configuration. Unlike Intel's LGA 1700 socket, AMD's AM5 platform does not support DDR4.
 Support for PCIe 5.0 lanes from the CPU on X670E and B650E, optional on X670 and B650 chipsets.
 Achieves 170W TDP and a Package Power Tracking (PPT) limit up to 230W.

Heatsink 
The AM5 socket specifies the 4 holes for fastening the heatsink to the motherboard to be placed in the corners of a rectangle with a lateral length of 54×90 mm, as well as UNC #6-32 screw threads for the backplate, identical to those of the preceding AM4 socket. Furthermore, the Z-height of the CPU package is kept the same as that of AM4, for backward compatibility of heatsinks.

Unlike AM4, the backplate on AM5 is not removable, as it also serves the purpose of securing the CPU retention mechanism for the LGA socket.

Not all existing CPU coolers from AM4 are compatible. In particular, coolers that use their own backplate mounting hardware, instead of the default motherboard-provided backplate, will not work. Some cooler manufacturers are offering upgrade kits to allow incompatible older coolers to be used on AM5.

Chipsets

Notes

References 

AMD sockets